The Fontana del Nettuno (Fountain of Neptune) is a monumental fountain located in the Piazza del Popolo in Rome.

History
It was constructed in 1822–23  at the terminus of a newly built aqueduct, the Acqua Vergine Nuovo.

Design
The fountains in the Piazza del Popolo were the work of Giovanni Ceccarini.  The Fontana del Nettuno is located on the west side of the square, and shows Neptune with his Trident, accompanied by two Tritons.

References

External links
 

Nettuno
Rome R. IV Campo Marzio
Sculptures of Neptune